The men's shot put event was part of the track and field athletics programme at the 1928 Summer Olympics. The competition was held on Sunday, 29 July 1928. Twenty-two shot putters from 14 nations competed. The maximum number of athletes per nation was 4. The event was won by Johnny Kuck of the United States, the nation's second consecutive, and seventh overall, victory in the men's shot put. Kuck set a new world record. Future film star Bruce Bennett, then still using his birth name Herman Brix, took silver. Emil Hirschfeld won Germany's first shot put medal with bronze.

Background

This was the eighth appearance of the event, which is one of 12 athletics events to have been held at every Summer Olympics. Ninth-place finisher Raoul Paoli of France was the highest-placed returning thrower from the 1924 Games. The world record holder and favorite coming into the event was Emil Hirschfeld of Germany, attempting to become only the second man from outside the United States to win.

Czechoslovakia and Romania made their debut in the men's shot put. The United States appeared for the eighth time, the only nation to have competed in all Olympic shot put competitions to date.

Competition format

The competition continued to use the two-round format used in 1900 and since 1908, with results carrying over between rounds. Each athlete received three throws in the qualifying round. The top six men advanced to the final, where they received an additional three throws. The best result, qualifying or final, counted.

Records

These were the standing world and Olympic records (in metres) prior to the 1928 Summer Olympics.

At first Bruce Bennett set a new Olympic record in the first round of the qualification with 15.75 metres. Emil Hirschfeld also threw better than the old Olympic record in the first throw, but was 3 centimetres short of Bennett's new mark. In the second round of the final John Kuck set a new world record with 15.87 metres.

Schedule

Results

The best six shot putters qualified for the final. The throwing order is not available and the throwing series are only incompletely available for the best six throwers.

References

External links
 Official Olympic Report
 

Shot
Shot put at the Olympics
Men's events at the 1928 Summer Olympics